This is a list of members of the South Australian House of Assembly from 1986 to 1989, as elected at the 1985 state election:

 Stan Evans, the MLA for Davenport and former Liberal MLA for Fisher, had been re-elected as an independent in 1985 after losing a preselection battle against incumbent Liberal and factional opponent Dean Brown. Evans subsequently rejoined the Liberal Party in 1986.

Members of South Australian parliaments by term
20th-century Australian politicians